"Let Her Go" is a song written and recorded by American country music artist Mark Collie. It was released in February 1991 as the third single from the album Hardin County Line. The song reached number 18 on the Billboard Hot Country Singles & Tracks chart.

Chart performance

References

1991 singles
Mark Collie songs
Song recordings produced by Tony Brown (record producer)
MCA Records singles
Song recordings produced by Doug Johnson (record producer)
Music videos directed by John Lloyd Miller
Songs written by Mark Collie
1991 songs